In Sikhism, the Five Virtues are fundamental qualities which one should develop in order to reach Mukti, or to reunite or merge with God. The Sikh Gurus taught that these positive human qualities were Sat (truth), Daya (compassion), Santokh (contentment), Nimrata (humility), and Pyaar (love).

Sat
Sat is the virtue of truthful living, which means practising "righteousness, honesty, justice, impartiality and fair play."

Santokh
Santokh, or contentment, is freedom "from ambition, envy, greed and jealousy. Without contentment, it is impossible to acquire peace of mind."

Daya

The exercise of Daya, or compassion, involves "considering another's difficulty or sorrow as one's own and helping to relieve it as far as possible. Compassion also includes the overlooking of imperfections and mistakes of others, for to err is human."

Nimrata
Nimrata, translated as "humility", "benevolence" or "humbleness", is the fourth virtue.

Pyaar

Pyaar requires Sikhs to be filled with the love of God.

See also
 Five precepts (in Buddhism)

References

Sikh terminology
Sikh beliefs
Sikh philosophy
Virtue